Magill is a suburb of Adelaide straddling the City of Burnside and City of Campbelltown council jurisdictions, approximately 7 km from the Adelaide CBD. It incorporates the suburb previously known as Koongarra Park.

History
They formed a partnership as a carrier and merchant following their arrival on 28 December 1836, and purchased Section 285, which was named after Cock's trustee, David M. Makgill. The estate's homestead was built in 1838 by Ferguson, who was charged with farming the estate. Soon after farming commenced the two were short of cash, and thus Magill became the first foothill village to be subdivided. The name change from Makgill to Magill occurred in the late 1940s, for reasons unknown.

Description
Geographically the suburb straddles two councils, with its northern portion within the City of Campbelltown and the southern part within the City of Burnside boundary.

Magill is home to one of the Penfolds Wineries, the University of South Australia Magill Campus and the historic Murray Park Estate.

The Magill Training Centre was situated in the area, but its location on Glen Stuart Road later became the adjoining suburb of Woodforde.

Schools
Magill has three educational institutions: Magill Primary School on Magill Road; Norwood Morialta High School (Senior Campus) on The Parade; and UniSA Magill Campus on St Bernards Road.

References

Suburbs of Adelaide